Varsha Bhosle (1956 – 8 October 2012) was an Indian singer, journalist and writer based in Mumbai. She was the daughter of Indian playback singer, Asha Bhosle.

Career
Bhosle was a professional Hindi and Bhojpuri playback singer, and appeared in concerts with her mother. Varsha finished school from Hill Grange High School, on Pedder Road, Mumbai, in 1973, with an ISC. She studied Political Science at Elphinstone College, which is affiliated with Bombay University in Mumbai.

She wrote columns for the Indian web portal Rediff during 1997 – 2003; columns for The Sunday Observer during 1994 – 1998; and for Gentleman magazine in 1993. She also wrote a few articles for The Times of India and for Rakshak – The Protector police magazine.

Personal life
She lived in Mumbai with her mother. She had married a sports writer and public relations professional Hemant Kenkre but the couple divorced in 1998. She had a history of depression, exacerbated by the death of a close friend, and underwent psychiatric treatment. On 9 September 2008, she reportedly attempted suicide by taking an overdose of prescribed medicine, after which she was admitted to Mumbai's Jaslok hospital. On 8 October 2012, Bhosle committed suicide at her Prabhu Kunj residence in Mumbai. Her body was discovered by her mother's driver and maid in a pool of blood on the sofa in her home. Mumbai Police later confirmed the suicide and said she shot herself in the head with a licensed weapon.

References

1956 births
2012 deaths
Indian women journalists
Indian women playback singers
University of Mumbai alumni
Suicides by firearm in India
The Times of India journalists
Indian women columnists
20th-century Indian journalists
20th-century Indian women singers
20th-century Indian singers
20th-century Indian women writers
Women writers from Maharashtra
Writers from Nagpur
21st-century Indian women writers
21st-century Indian writers
21st-century Indian journalists
Musicians from Nagpur
Women musicians from Maharashtra
Singers from Maharashtra
Hill Grange High School alumni
2012 suicides